Zakare Zakaryan or Zakaria II Mkhargrdzeli, was an Armenian general of Queen Tamar of Georgia army during the late 12th and early 13th centuries. He was the ruler of feudal lands in the Kingdom of Georgia.

Biography 
Zakaria along with his father Sargis supported the rebellion of Prince Demna and the Orbeli family in 1177, however they soon sided with George III and fought for the monarchy against the insurgents. The uprising was suppressed, and King George III elevated the Zakarid–Mkhargrdzeli family. Following the death of George III, Queen Tamar elevated Sargis Mkhargrdzeli — a well-born valorous man, well-trained in battle — to the office of Amirspasalar (Lord High Constable) and granted him possessions over Lori (which was deprived of from Kubasar). She gave presents to his elder son, Zakaria, and his younger son, Ivane, and she made him a member of the Darbazi. During a revolt of Queen Tamar's disgraced husband, George the Rus', around 1191, Zakaria Mkhargrdzeli was one of the few nobles who remained loyal to the queen. Tamar gradually expanded her own power-base and elevated her loyal nobles to high positions at the court, most notably the Mkhargrdzeli.

In the ninth year of Tamar's reign, the Mandaturtukhutsesi and Amirspasalar Zakaria (Zakare) Mkhargrdzeli and his brother Ivane the atabeg took Dvin in 1193. They also took Gelakun, Bjni, Amberd, and Bargushat, and all the towns along Araxes basin, up to the Khodaafarin bridge. Around the year 1199, a Georgian army under Zakare's command took the city of Ani from Shadaddid control, and in 1201, Tamar gave it to him as a fief. Zakare commanded the Georgian army for almost three decades, achieving major victories at Shamkor in 1195 and Basian in 1203 and leading raids into northern Iran in 1210, devastating Tabriz, Khoy, Ardabil and reaching as far as Qazvin. Zakare left several bilingual inscriptions across the Armeno-Georgian borderlands and built several churches and forts, such as the Harichavank Monastery and Akhtala Monastery in northern Armenia. After Zakaria's death, his holdings were inherited by the aging Ivane, who had given Ani to his nephew Shanshe, son of Zakare.

References

Nobility of Georgia (country)
12th-century people from Georgia (country)
House of Mkhargrdzeli
13th-century people from Georgia (country)
1212 deaths